SHASN is a multiplayer political strategy board game created by Zain Memon, and published by Memesys Culture Lab, where each player takes on the role of a politician contesting elections and is required to take a stand on various political and ethical issues. The game was launched on the global crowdfunding platform, Kickstarter on 16 July 2019, and raised $339,045 from 4,209 backers. SHASN was inspired by the documentary An Insignificant Man, on the rise of the Aam Aadmi Party politician and Delhi chief minister Arvind Kejriwal.

Gameplay 
SHASN is a competitive strategy board game played between two to five players which gives players an opportunity to influence the maximum number of majority voters in the 9 zones (or constituencies) on the game board. Voters are influenced via combinations of resources such as funds, clout, media, and trust. These resources are gained by answering questions on the Ideology Cards which are about real-world political, social, and ethical issues. The game ends when a majority has been formed in all possible zones on the board.

There are 4 ideologies in the game including The Capitalist, The Supremo, The Showstopper (originally called The Showman), and The Idealist. Players gain Ideology Cards by answering questions.

The type of ideology card players gain depends on which ideology their chosen answer falls under. Within the game, The Capitalist focuses on free trade, The Supremo focuses on identity politics, The Showstopper focuses on gaining media attention through shock tactics, and The Idealist focuses on making the world a better place. If the players gain 2, 3, or 5 cards of one ideology, they gain powers specific to that ideology.

Development and release 
The development of the game began in January 2018 and continued over the course of one and a half years.
Anand Gandhi is the executive producer of SHASN. The game was also produced by Vinay Shukla and Khushboo Ranka 

SHASN released to widespread critical acclaim. Stephen Gulik of Everything Board Games said, "They nailed American politics better than any other game I can think of.” Dan Thurot of Space Biff called it “one of the most unhinged, perceptive, outlandish, and timely games… simultaneously laugh-out-loud funny and… disquieting..” Jeremiah Slack of g33k-HQ said, “The game reels you in from the start... once you start playing you cannot help but get excited about your next turn.” Jessica Fisher of gameosity commented on the “Razor-fine aesthetic that drew me in instantly."

SHASN has a huge player base internationally and is now played in over 60 countries. 

As of September 2021, three editions of SHASN have been launched- Standard Edition, Essential Edition, and the Founder's Edition. Taking players across many nations and eras, SHASN launched with 5 campaigns - India 2020, USA 2020, UK 2019-20: Brexit, Fall Of The Republic: Rome 40 BCE, and The Future Of Humanity: Earth 2040.

Standalone expansion
SHASN: AZADI, co-designed by Abhishek Lamba and Zain Memon was launched on Kickstarter on September 8 2021. It met its funding goal within an hour, and went on to raise over $200,000 over the course of its campaign.

AZADI brought stories of revolution from across the world to the fore. It launched with 5 campaigns - South Asian Independence 1947, Russian Revolution 1917, American Revolution 1776, Egyptian Revolution 2011, and Mars: 2165.

Since its launch, campaigns for the French Revolution, Indus Valley Revolution, and an undisclosed campaign depicting an ongoing struggle have been made available as additional campaigns.

Awards

References 

Board games
Indian board games
Board games introduced in 2019